Metropolitan Railway electric locomotives were used on London's Metropolitan Railway with conventional carriage stock. On the outer suburban routes an electric locomotive was used at the Baker Street end that was exchanged for a steam locomotive en route (latterly at Rickmansworth).

The first ten had a central cab and were known as camel-backs, and these entered service in 1906. A year later another ten units with a box design and a driving position at each end arrived. These were replaced by more powerful units in the early 1920s.

The locomotives were withdrawn from passenger service in 1962 after electrification reached Amersham and the A Stock electric multiple units entered service. One locomotive, No. 5 John Hampden, is preserved as a static display at London Transport Museum, and another, No. 12 Sarah Siddons, has been used for heritage events.

Westinghouse
The Metropolitan Railway ordered electric locomotives from British Westinghouse and made by Metropolitan Amalgamated. The first ten were built with Westinghouse electrical control equipment and entered service in 1906. Initially there was only one position for the driver which proved troublesome, and a second master controller was soon added.

British Thompson Houston
The second ten, also constructed by Metropolitan Amalgamated, were built to a box car design with British Thompson Houston control equipment. The control equipment was replaced with the Westinghouse type in 1919.

Metropolitan-Vickers

In the early 1920s, the Metropolitan placed an order with Metropolitan-Vickers of Barrow-in-Furness for rebuilding the twenty electric locomotives. When work started on the first locomotive, it was found to be impractical and uneconomical and the order was changed to building completely new locomotives using some equipment recovered from the originals.

In 1925, no. 15 was exhibited on the Metropolitan Railway's stand at the British Empire Exhibition; the panelling was removed from one side, so that the equipment inside could be viewed. The locomotives were all named, the first nameplates being fitted on 18 March 1927. Nineteen of the names chosen were of people, real or fictitious, who had a connection with the area served by the Metropolitan; the exception was no. 15, the exhibition locomotive of 1925, which became Wembley 1924. Nameplates were removed during World War II.

In 1953 the fifteen remaining locomotives were overhauled and the traction control equipment replaced by BTH equipment from District line cars. Nameplates were refitted.

After electrification to Amersham was completed in 1961, the locomotives were withdrawn from passenger service although three were kept as shunters.

One locomotive, No. 5 John Hampden, is preserved as a static display at London Transport Museum and another, No. 12 Sarah Siddons, has been used for heritage events, most recently in January 2019 running in conjunction with Metropolitan Railway Locomotive No. 1 on steam excursions to mark the 150th anniversary of the opening of the District Railway.

List of Locomotives

Accidents and incidents
On 18 June 1925, locomotive No.4 collided with a passenger train at Baker Street station when a signal was changed from green to red just as the locomotive was passing it. Six people were injured.

References

Notes

Bibliography

Further reading

Metropolitan Railway locomotives
Electric locomotives of Great Britain
600 V DC locomotives